Arie van Lent (born 31 August 1970) is a Dutch former professional footballer, who played as a forward. He was most recently the manager of SpVgg Unterhaching.

Playing career
At the age of 12, van Lent played for the youth team of Sparta 57 Opheusden. In his youth, he dreamed of being with Ajax Amsterdam or PSV Eindhoven.

He spent much professional career as a journeyman in Germany, mostly on the bench of Werder Bremen or featuring for second-division sides and below. In 1997, he famously scored four goals in Werder Bremen's 3–2 home win in the Bundesliga against 1. FC Köln, one of which was an own goal.

Later, he became a regular in the Bundesliga with Borussia Mönchengladbach. In 2004, van Lent joined the then-second division side Eintracht Frankfurt and became their vice captain and leading scorer (16 goals) in their promotion campaign. During the 2005–06 season, van Lent lost his starting place to Ioannis Amanatidis.

He last played for Rot-Weiss Essen, where he had a contract until 30 June 2008. However, the contract was cancelled in December 2006.

Coaching career
In summer 2007, he was named as the new head coach of 1. FC Kleve and worked here until March 2009. From July 2010 to June 2011 he was the head coach of Rot Weiss Ahlen. On 10 May 2011, it was confirmed he will be the new head coach of Kickers Offenbach in the 2011–12 season. On 1 October 2013, van Lent became a coach of the A-youth (U-19) of Borussia Mönchengladbach.

On 18 August 2020, he was appointed as the head coach of SpVgg Unterhaching. Following the 2020–21 season that resulted in a relegation for the club, he left Unterhaching by mutual consent.

Personal life
Arie van Lent has Dutch and the German citizenship. He is married, is a father of a daughter and lived in Korschenbroich, North Rhine-Westphalia, Germany.

References

External links

1970 births
Living people
People from Neder-Betuwe
Dutch footballers
Footballers from Gelderland
Association football forwards
Bundesliga players
2. Bundesliga players
SV Werder Bremen players
SV Werder Bremen II players
VfB Oldenburg players
SpVgg Greuther Fürth players
Borussia Mönchengladbach players
Eintracht Frankfurt players
Rot-Weiss Essen players
Dutch football managers
3. Liga managers
Rot Weiss Ahlen managers
Kickers Offenbach managers
SpVgg Unterhaching managers
Dutch expatriate footballers
Dutch expatriate football managers
Dutch expatriate sportspeople in Germany
Expatriate footballers in Germany
Expatriate football managers in Germany
Expatriate footballers in West Germany
Dutch expatriate sportspeople in West Germany